Split Lake may refer to:

Split Lake, Manitoba, a community in Manitoba, Canada
Split Lake (Manitoba), a lake in Manitoba, Canada
Split Lake (New Zealand), a lake in Northland, New Zealand